A rose is a perennial plant of the genus Rosa, or the flower it bears. 

Rose may also refer to:

Colors
 Rose (color)
 RAL 3017 Rose
 Rose (heraldic tincture)

Arts, entertainment and media

Film
 Rose (2011 film), a Polish film
 Rose (2012 film), a British film
 Rose (2014 film), an Indian film
 Rose (2017 film), an American film
 The Rose (film), a 1979 American film

Television
 The Rose (TV series), a 2003 Taiwanese drama
 Rose (TV series), a 2019 Burmese dramatic television series
 Rose (Doctor Who), name of an episode and multiple characters
 "Rose" (The Vampire Diaries), an episode of The Vampire Diarires
 Rose (Keeping Up Appearances)
 Rose (Two and a Half Men)
 "Rose" (Titans episode)
 Rose (Titans character)

Gaming
 ROSE Online, a 2005 roleplaying game
 Rose (Street Fighter)
 Rose, a fairy chess piece
 Chairman Rose, a character from the game Pokémon Sword and Shield

Literature
 Rose (comics), a comic book miniseries by Jeff Smith
 Rose (Marvel Comics), a persona used by several characters in Marvel Comics
 The Rose (comics) or Richard Fisk, a character in Marvel Comics
 Rose (novel), a novel by Martin Cruz Smith
 Rose (play), a 1999 play by Tomson Highway
 "The Rose", a novella by Charles L. Harness
 "The Rose", a section of the collected works of W. B. Yeats
 "The Rose", a fairy tale from Grimms' Fairy Tales

Music
 Rosette (music), a soundhole decoration
 The Rose (band), a South Korean band

Classical
 "Rose", the theme song from Titanic: Music from the Motion Picture
 Rose, a work by Ludovico Einaudi
 La Rose, a work by Giovanni Bassano
 "La Rose", a song by Giovanni Battista Rubini

Albums
 Rose (Maximilian Hecker album) (2003)
 Rose (Miliyah Kato album) (2005)
 The Rose (soundtrack), the soundtrack to the 1979 film
 The Rose (TV soundtrack), the soundtrack for the 2003 Taiwanese drama The Rose
 R.O.S.E., a 2018 album by Jessie J
 Rose, an EP by B.A.P (2017)
 Rose, an EP by Menomena (2001)
 The Rose, a 2002 album by Mediæval Bæbes

Songs
 "Rose" (Anna Tsuchiya song)
 "The Rose" (song), a 1977 song written by Amanda McBroom and made famous by Bette Midler
 "Rose", a song by  A Perfect Circle from their 2000 album Mer de Noms

People
 Rose (given name)
 Rose (surname)
 Rose (French singer), born 1978
 Justice Rose (disambiguation)

Places
 Rose, Nova Scotia, Canada
 Rose (Brachtpe), a river of North Rhine-Westphalia, Germany
 Rose, Calabria, Italy
 Rose, Cornwall, England, United Kingdom
 Rose-an-Grouse, Cornwall, England, United Kingdom
 Rose, Nebraska, an unincorporated community in the United States
 Rose, New York, a town in Wayne County, New York, United States
 Rose (hamlet), New York, a hamlet in Wayne County, New York, United States
 Rose, Oklahoma, United States
 Rose, Wisconsin, United States

Plants
 Christmas rose, Helleborus niger
 Cotton rose, Hibiscus mutabilis
 Desert rose, Adenium
 Guelder rose, Viburnum opulus
 Lenten rose, Helleborus orientalis
 Montpellier rock rose, Cistus monspeliensis
 Primrose, Primula vulgaris
 Rock rose, Cistus
 Rose bay willow herb, Chamaenerion angustifolium
 Rose bay, Nerium oleander, the only species in the genus Nerium
 Rose campion, Silene coronaria
 Rose of China, Hibiscus rosa-sinensis
 Rose of Jericho, Selaginella lepidophylla
 Rose of Sharon, Hypericum calycinum (British Isles) or Hibiscus syriacus (North America)
 Rosemary, Rosmarinus
 Roseroot, Rhodiola rosea
 Rosewood (several species)
 Sun rose, Cistus
 Sydney rock rose, Boronia serrulata
 Wood rose, Distimake tuberosus

Science
 ROSE (compiler framework)
 A/ROSE, computer operating system
 Remote Operations Service Element protocol, an OSI application layer protocol

Ships
 HMS Rose, a list of ships
 HMS Rose (1712), a 24-gun sixth rate
 HMS Rose (1757), a 20-gun sixth rate 
 HMS Rose (replica ship) or HMS Surprise, a 1970 replica
 HMS Rose (1783), a 28-gun sixth rate
 HM hired cutter Rose, a number of hired armed vessels named Rose
 Rose (1786 EIC ship), a British East India Company ship
 Rose (1806 ship), a British slave ship
 , a Norwegian cargo ship in service 1938–1939
 USS Rose, a Union Navy tugboat

Theatres
 Rose Theatre, Brampton, Ontario
 Rose Theatre, Kingston, England
 The Rose (theatre), London, England

Other uses
 Rose (symbolism)
 Rose (cocktail), a cocktail made of vermouth and cherry eau de vie
 Rose (goat)
 Rose (heraldry), a common device in heraldry
 Rose (mathematics), a sinusoid plotted in polar coordinates
 Rose (topology), a topological space
 Repression of heat shock gene expression (ROSE) element, an RNA element
 ROSE Bikes, a producer of bicycles and equipment from Germany
 Rose Law Firm, a legal practice in Little Rock, Arkansas
 Rose, a water-scattering head of a watering can spout
 The Rose Gaming Resort, an under-construction casino resort in Dumfries, Virginia, United States
 Compass rose, a graphic used on maps
 Gold dipped roses
 Project ROSE, a Pakistan Air Force program
 Tropical Storm Rose

See also
 Rosé (disambiguation)
 Rose Garden (disambiguation)
 Rose Hill (disambiguation)
 Corn rose (disambiguation)
 Desert rose (disambiguation)
 Red rose (disambiguation)
 Tokyo Rose (disambiguation)
 Wild Rose (disambiguation)
 The Rose of Tralee (disambiguation)
 
 Rosa (disambiguation)
 Rosea (disambiguation)
 Roselle (disambiguation)
 Rosen (disambiguation)
 Roser (disambiguation)
 Roses (disambiguation)
 Rosette (disambiguation)
 Rosie (disambiguation)
 Rosine (disambiguation)
 Rosy (disambiguation)
 Roze (disambiguation)